The 2001 African Judo Championships was organised by the African Judo Union in Tripoli, Libya from 6 Nov 2001 to 9 Nov 2001.

References

External links
 

African Judo Championships
African Championships
Sports competitions in Libya
November 2001 sports events in Africa